The boys' 85 kg weightlifting event was the second men's event at the weightlifting competition at the 2014 Summer Youth Olympics, with competitors limited to a maximum of 85 kilograms of body mass.

Each lifter performed in both the snatch and clean and jerk lifts, with the final score being the sum of the lifter's best result in each. The athlete received three attempts in each of the two lifts; the score for the lift was the heaviest weight successfully lifted.

Results

External links
Results_Book p.16
olympedia.org

Weightlifting at the 2014 Summer Youth Olympics